Laljibhai Meena  is an Indian politician. He was elected to the Lok Sabha, the lower house of the Parliament of India  as a member of the Janata Party.

References

External links
Official biographical sketch in Parliament of India website

Janata Party politicians
Bharatiya Jana Sangh politicians
Lok Sabha members from Rajasthan
1944 births
Living people